Streptomyces avidinii is a bacterium species from the genus of Streptomyces which produces streptavidin.

See also 
 List of Streptomyces species

References

Further reading

External links
Type strain of Streptomyces avidinii at BacDive -  the Bacterial Diversity Metadatabase

avidinii
Bacteria described in 1964